Andre Agassi defeated Stefan Edberg in the final, 6–1, 6–4, 0–6, 6–2 to win the men's singles tennis title at the 1990 Miami Open.

Ivan Lendl was the defending champion, but lost in the fourth round to Emilio Sánchez.

Seeds
All seeds received a bye to the second round.

Main draw

Finals

Top half

Section 1

Section 2

Section 3

Section 4

Bottom half

Section 5

Section 6

Section 7

Section 8

References
 1990 Lipton International Players Championships Singles Draw

1990 Lipton International Players Championships